The Seoul International Youth Film Festival (SIYFF) is the biggest youth film festival in Korea and has provided a venue for youths to share their culture via films and media education since 1999. It aims to promote broader international exchanges among talented cine kids and establish network to improve their competitiveness in the film industry.

See also
List of festivals in South Korea
List of festivals in Asia

External links

Children's film festivals
Annual events in South Korea
Film festivals in Seoul